Williams v. Illinois, 399 U.S. 235 (1970), was a United States Supreme Court case in which the Court held that, if a person cannot afford to pay a fine, it violates the Equal Protection Clause to convert that unpaid fine into jail time to extend a person's incarceration beyond a statutory maximum length.

The syllabus of the case stated:

A companion case, Morris v. Schoonfield, was "remanded for reconsideration in light of intervening Maryland legislation and decision in Williams".

See also
Bearden v. Georgia, 461 U.S. 660 (1983)
Tate v. Short, 401 U.S. 395 (1971)

References

External links
 

1970 in United States case law
United States equal protection case law
United States Supreme Court cases
United States Supreme Court cases of the Burger Court